Jim Arnold Skaalen (b. July 6, 1954, in Holland, Michigan) is a former Major League Baseball hitting coach for the Milwaukee Brewers and the Oakland A's.

Career
Skaalen played professionally for three seasons in the Baltimore Orioles organization and batted .246 with 15 HR and 123 RBIs in 251 games.

Coaching
He began his coaching career in 1981 at Single-A Daytona Beach and managed in the minor leagues for the San Diego (1982–86) and Texas (1987–89) organizations.

Skaalen has also served as Minor League Hitting Instructor for Texas (1990), Coordinator of Minor League Instruction for Seattle (1991–96), Director of Player Development for the Padres (1997–99) and Minor League Hitting Coordinator for the Brewers (2000–06).

In his first season on a Major League coaching staff in 2007, the Brewers hit a franchise record and ML-leading 231 home runs.

Skaalen joined the A's in December 2008 after spending the previous two seasons as the Brewers' hitting coach.

References 

1954 births
Living people
Major League Baseball hitting coaches
Bluefield Orioles players
Charlotte O's players
Milwaukee Brewers coaches
Oakland Athletics coaches
San Diego Padres executives
Toronto Blue Jays scouts
Minor league baseball coaches
Minor league baseball managers